Julie Goldman (born in Boston, Massachusetts) is an American comedian, actress, and podcaster. She is best known for her work on Bravo’s The People’s Couch, and HBO’s Curb Your Enthusiasm. In 2016, she started a podcast with her comedy partner Brandy Howard, called Dumb Gay Politics, which recaps politics like reality TV.

Goldman starred on The Big Gay Sketch Show, a sketch comedy show on the Logo television network. Her first stand-up performance was at The Comedy Connection in Boston, Massachusetts, at the age of 15. She attended Lexington High School and Emerson College in Boston. Julie founded an all-women's stand-up and variety show called "OFFENSIVE WOMEN" and recruited Eve Ensler to sponsor their biggest show to date at The Zipper Theater in NYC.

Goldman is a frequent guest on Jonny McGovern's weekly podcast Gay Pimpin' with Jonny McGovern. In 2010 Goldman joined the cast of the podcast.

As well as featuring on Gay Pimpin' with Jonny McGovern, Goldman co-hosts Dumb, Gay Politics, a political comedy podcast, alongside writing partner Brandy Howard.

Goldman is working on raising money for Nicest Thing, a feature-length, lesbian romantic comedy that she co-wrote with Brandy Howard. Goldman and Howard are producing the movie with Amanda Bearse who is also slated to direct. Other attachments include Tammy Lynn Michaels, Guinevere Turner, Kate Clinton, Paul Vogt, Bryce Johnson and Kate McKinnon.

Julie Goldman and Brandy Howard co-host Julie & Brandy in Your Box Office, a webseries on lesbian website Autostraddle, in which they provide reviews and re-enactments of movies. In "In Your Box Office FOR REAL," Julie & Brandy go behind the scenes for events like The Michigan Womyn's Music Festival and The VH1 DO Something Awards, where Julie performed with Jane Lynch.

Goldman and Howard wrote for Joan Rivers on Fashion Police on E!.

Goldman appeared as a contestant on the second season of RuPaul's Drag U the summer of 2011.

Julie Goldman and Brandy Howard appear on The People's Couch aired on Bravo.

Filmography
 The Sopranos, 2002
 Butch in the City, 2003
 The D Word,  2005
 Mom, 2006 (a.k.a. Big Dreams in Little Hope)
 Out at the Wedding, 2007
 Happy Birthday, 2008
 The Big Gay Sketch Show, 2006-2010 
  Julie & Brandy in Your Box Office, 2010–present
 RuPaul's Drag U, 2011 (Episode 3)
 The New Normal, 2012
 The People's Couch, 2014-2016
 Murder in the First, 2014
 The Mindy Project, 2014
 Faking It, 2014
 Curb Your Enthusiasm, 2017
 The Morning Show, 2018
 Stumptown, 2020
 Call Me Kat, 2021
 Dollface, 2022

References

External links
julieandbrandy.com
dumbgaypolitics.com
DGP on Patreon
"In Your Box Office." on Autostraddle.com

Actresses from Boston
American women comedians
Jewish American musicians
Jewish American female comedians
Jewish American actresses
American lesbian actresses
Lesbian comedians
American lesbian musicians
American sketch comedians
LGBT Jews
LGBT people from Massachusetts
Living people
Year of birth missing (living people)
Comedians from Massachusetts
21st-century American comedians
21st-century American women
21st-century LGBT people
21st-century American Jews
American LGBT comedians